Tally Hall (sometimes stylized as tallyhall) is an American rock band formed in Ann Arbor, Michigan, in December 2002. The band is known for upbeat melodies and whimsical lyrics. The members originally described their musical style as "wonky rock," later redefining their sound as "fabloo", in an effort to not let their music be defined by any particular genres after people began to start defining the characteristics of "wonky rock".

Tally Hall has five members, each of them distinguished by the color of their neckties: guitarist Rob Cantor (yellow), guitarist Joe Hawley (red), drummer Ross Federman (gray), keyboardist Andrew Horowitz (green), and bassist Zubin Sedghi (blue). Every member has provided vocals for the band. With touring partner Casey Shea (black), touring partner and producer Bora Karaca (orange).

Once under the Atlantic Records recording label, Tally Hall was, again, signed to indie label Quack! Media, who previously helped finance and nationally distribute their debut studio album, Marvin's Marvelous Mechanical Museum. They released their second album, Good & Evil, on June 21, 2011.

Tally Hall also provided the vocals and music for all of the songs in Happy Monster Band, a children's television series that aired on Playhouse Disney.

History

Early years and Marvin's Marvelous Mechanical Museum
Andrew Horowitz, one of the only members not originally from Michigan, began writing songs when he was eight years old, and attended the University of Michigan, studying composition. There he met Rob Cantor, who had both attended high school with Zubin Sedghi and joined Joe Hawley's film production group, AnonyMous. Tally Hall’s original drummer, Steve Gallagher, left the band in May of 2004. Ross Federman, who Joe knew from high school, took his place shortly thereafter.

On October 24, 2005, the band released their debut studio album, Marvin's Marvelous Mechanical Museum, with violinist Jeremy Kittel contributing strings. They re-released the album on September 12, 2006, on the local label Quack! Media. Tally Hall went on to receive national media attention, performing their song "Good Day" on The Late Late Show with Craig Ferguson on August 2, 2006, as well as appearing in MTV's segment You Hear It First in September 2006. The band appeared at the 2007 South by Southwest Music Festival. Also in March 2007, they were signed to Atlantic Records and rerecorded their first album. They didn't release the updated version until April 1, 2008. In August 2008, Tally Hall was a performer on the BMI stage at Lollapalooza.

Tally Hall was invited back by The Late Late Show with Craig Ferguson on September 16, 2008, to help promote the launch of Tally Hall's Internet Show. They performed "Welcome to Tally Hall" in newly donned black vests over top of their traditional colored ties, white shirts, and black pants.

The band worked on several projects after the completion of Marvin's Marvelous Mechanical Museum, including covering the song "Smile Like You Mean It" by The Killers for the sixth The O.C. soundtrack: Music from the OC: Mix 6.

Tours and Good & Evil
On September 9, 2009, Hidden in the Sand (HITS), a prominent Tally Hall fansite, broke the news that Tally Hall was going to release a collaborative song, featuring Nellie McKay, which would be released as a free download from mp3.walmart.com when customers of Walmart purchased The Magician's Elephant by Kate DiCamillo. The book had been made available for purchase earlier that day. The same day, HITS reported the title of the song, "Light & Night", along with a short audio clip of it in another update.

In their 2010 March tour with Jukebox the Ghost and Skybox, it was reported that Joe Hawley had unexpectedly backed out of the tour. Hawley was replaced with Casey Shea, who wore a black tie, and would subsequently fill in for him for the rest of their live shows that year. On March 25, 2011, the band announced that all five original band members were still together.

The band was managed by The Hornblow Group, who also manages They Might Be Giants, OK Go, and Oppenheimer, until 2010, when Tally Hall changed management to Stiletto Entertainment, who manages Barry Manilow, in addition to several other solo performance acts.

Their second album, Good & Evil, was released. With the release of Good & Evil, Tally Hall returned to their original label, Quack!Media.

In order to promote the album, the band held a contest where the winner would be awarded their own theme song. The winner was a high school student named Nathan Naimark, whose self titled theme song would be released soon after. Around the same time, the band released a cover of the Flo Rida song "Club Can't Handle Me", with Casey Shea on guest vocals.

After the release of Good & Evil and its subsequent tour, the band became inactive, and all of its members went on to independent endeavors, though some of the projects had multiple members of the band collaborate once again.

Beyond Good & Evil
In 2012, Andrew Horowitz, under the moniker "edu", released a solo album called sketches. He was also involved in production and piano on John Legend's Love in the Future.

Joe Hawley returned to school, but released an album alongside Federman and Bora Karaca, Hawaii: Part II, as part of his musical side project ミラクルミュージカル (Miracle Musical). Tally Hall members Sedghi and Cantor appeared on the album on the tracks "White Ball" and "Time Machine", respectively.

Ross Federman has made occasional appearances as a producer, percussionist, and DJ under the pseudonym "Mr. F", although his main focus has been school. He graduated from the University of Michigan in 2013 with a Bachelor of Science in Cell and Molecular Biology, and graduated from Yale University with a Ph.D. in Immunology in May 2019. Federman is married, and he and his wife had their first child in 2022.

Zubin, aside from appearing in Hawaii: Part II, shifted his focus towards his personal life. He graduated from the University of Michigan with an undergraduate honors degree in neuroscience, then attended Touro University California for medical school. He now works as a family medicine doctor at Kaiser Permanente in Orange County, California. Sedghi is married with two kids. As of 2020, Horowitz stated during his Instagram Livestream Keep Up the Good Work: "So Zubin, correct me if I'm wrong, but he's on the frontline right now, working at a hospital. Well, last we heard, he was like, he was quarantined for, he couldn't... they thought he might be sick, so he was in quarantine for two weeks, then he went back to work in the hospital, and, as far as I know, he's working.In 2014, Hawley, again under ミラクルミュージカル, released Hawaii: Part II: Part ii, an album containing demos and samples from Hawaii: Part II.

Cantor released his solo album, Not a Trampoline, on April 14, 2014. In addition, he has made several viral videos on YouTube, including "SHIA LABEOUF" and "29 Celebrity Impressions, 1 Original Song - Rob Cantor". He also records songs for Disney Junior Musical Nursery Rhymes.

In 2015, Tally Hall's Bandcamp page was updated with a demo LP entitled Admittedly Incomplete Demos, in reference to their earlier collection Complete Demos. The LP included demos of songs from Good & Evil as well as unreleased songs and live performances. It also included studio versions of covers for the songs Just A Friend and The Minstrel Boy. The former, Just A Friend, was included in the track-lists for versions of Marvin's Marvelous Mechanical Museum that included bonus tracks.

Later in 2015, Hawley (ミラクルミュージカル) released Hawaii Partii, an album containing 8-bit renditions of select Hawaii: Part II songs.

In mid-2016, Hawley announced a comedy hip-hop album Joe Hawley Joe Hawley, which was released in October of that year. In 2019, Hawley released γɘlwɒH ɘoႱ γɘlwɒH ɘoႱ, a reversed version of the album. This was due to the large amounts of sampling he used, and to avoid copyright. Eventually, the album was released in its original state in 2020. It is assumed Joe Hawley gained clearance for the samples used on the album, as all songs but one are available on the official release.

In 2018, Horowitz released studio versions of piano compositions written in 2003 for the album etudes.

In April 2019, Horowitz released studio versions of piano compositions written in 2005 while he was a student at the University of Michigan for the album etudes II.

In August 2019, the band re-released their archived cover of Biz Markie's "Just a Friend", which was originally only found on their album Admittedly Incomplete Demos.

In May 2020, Horowitz started a weekly Instagram Livestream series titled Keep Up The Good Work, where he has one or two guests on each stream. A few of these guests have included Tally Hall alumni, such as members Ross and Zubin.

In January 2021, it was announced that Needlejuice Records would be reissuing the band's two studio albums on vinyl, CD, and cassette. The attempted midnight release of Marvin's Marvelous Mechanical Museum on March 13 led to a lag spike on the website, due to the high volume of fans attempting to purchase the album at release. Later, in June, Marvin's Marvelous Mechanical Museum was released on MiniDisc to coincide with International MiniDisc Day. They announced their intentions to reissue Good & Evil in January 2022. In August 2022, the reissue pre-order date was announced to be the 26th of that month. It was also announced that a 7' vinyl would accompany the Good & Evil reissue called Turn the Lights Off which contains the aforementioned track on the A side and Light & Night (a single which hadn't been released since 2009) on the B side.

In April 2022, 2 new tracks were added to "Admittedly Incomplete Demos": "Welcome to Tally Hall (Reprise) (Demo)" and "Hymn For a Scarecrow (Demo)".

Since the band's hiatus, members such as Joe Hawley, Andrew Horowitz, and Ross Federman have suggested the band would eventually come back for a third album, with Joe Hawley promising it on Twitter and other platforms.

Videos 
When the band formed Joe Hawley was working on a comedy sketch group called Anonymous, and made several Tally Hall songs into videos with his group.

In addition to music, the band has also created numerous movies. These movies include both music videos and humorous skits. The best known of these videos is the music video for "Banana Man", which resulted in significant publicity among online users visiting the website Albino Blacksheep, along with "The Bidding", another popular title by the group.

Corresponding with their single "Good Day", released on February 26, 2008, the band released a music video for the song on YouTube, which was previously on Tally Hall's Internet Show.

In August 2008, the band performed a three-song live video set for LiveDaily Sessions, including the songs "Good Day", "Be Born", and "Greener", which premiered on August 28, 2008. They have appeared on Fearless Music several times, playing songs such as "Be Born", "Ruler of Everything", "Misery Fell", "Good Day", and "Banana Man". These recordings can be found on YouTube.

In July 2014, band member Rob Cantor released a video in which he seemed to perform his song "Perfect" by singing spot-on impressions of 29 celebrities. In the video, Cantor is accompanied by another band member, Andrew Horowitz, on piano and backing vocals. The video received more than 7,000,000 views in 10 days. Shortly thereafter, Cantor revealed the video to be an elaborate hoax.

Tally Hall's Internet Show and music videos
Taking on an even larger role within the band's video portfolio was the ten-part bi-weekly variety-show series Tally Hall's Internet Show (T.H.I.S.), which debuted on September 15, 2008. Each episode ran 10 minutes long and was posted on their website. The content primarily included comedy sketches and music videos.

With the release of Tally Hall's Internet Show in September 2008, it became clear that many music videos would be released within the Internet Show. "Good Day" was the first music video to be seen in episode one. Other music videos include "Dream", "Greener", "Hidden in the Sand", "Ruler of Everything", "Taken for a Ride", "The Whole World and You", "Two Wuv", and "Welcome to Tally Hall". A song from their second album, "Turn the Lights Off", also has a music video. The music video for their song "&" was abandoned before its release.

Episode list 
 Good Day (September 15, 2008) – 9:24
 Death Request (September 29, 2008) – 11:36
 Taken for a Ride (October 13, 2008) – 9:17
 Welcome to Tally Hall (October 27, 2008) – 11:37
 Who Cares (November 10, 2008) – 9:25
 Two Wuv (November 24, 2008) – 10:32
 Fifteen Seconds of Bora (December 8, 2008) – 9:08
 The Whole World and You (December 22, 2008) – 11:06
 Potato Vs. Spoon (January 5, 2009) – 8:30
 Good Night (January 19, 2009) – 10:52

Canned episodes 
 South by Southwest 2007 (December 23, 2013) – 12:06

Band members

Current members 
Rob Cantor (Yellow tie) – guitar, vocals, percussion 
Joe Hawley (Red tie) – guitar, vocals, percussion 
Andrew Horowitz (Green tie) – keyboards, percussion, vocals 
Zubin Sedghi (Blue tie) – bass, vocals 
Ross Federman (Grey tie) – drums, percussion, occasional vocals

Past members 
Steve Gallagher (Grey tie) – drums, percussion

Additional touring members 
Casey Shea (Black tie) – guitar, vocals, percussion (Replacement for Joe Hawley, 2010)
Bora Karaca (Orange tie) – keyboards, percussion, acoustic guitar, accordion, whistling, backing vocals, mascot (Good & Evil Tour, Summer 2011)

Timeline

Discography 

 Marvin's Marvelous Mechanical Museum (2005)
 Good & Evil (2011)

References

External links 

 
 Hidden In The Sand - The Ultimate Tally Hall Fan Headquarters

Indie rock musical groups from Michigan
Musical groups from Ann Arbor, Michigan
Atlantic Records artists
Music of Ann Arbor, Michigan
Musical groups established in 2002
2002 establishments in Michigan
Rock music groups from Michigan
Musical groups from Michigan
American power pop groups
Progressive pop musicians